The 1991 Florida State Seminoles football team represented Florida State University in the 1991 NCAA Division I-A football season. The team was coached by Bobby Bowden and played their home games at Doak Campbell Stadium.  This was Florida State's final season as an independent; it joined the Atlantic Coast Conference the following season.

Florida State finished the season ranked #4 in both polls. They started the season ranked at the top of the polls, but were dropped in the rankings after Wide Right I. The Seminoles offense scored 449 points while the defense allowed 188 points. After the completion of the regular season, they competed in the Cotton Bowl Classic.

Quarterback Casey Weldon was runner-up for the Heisman Trophy.

Schedule

Roster

Rankings

Season summary

BYU

Tulane

Western Michigan

Michigan

Syracuse

Virginia Tech

Miami (FL)

at Florida

Texas A&M (Cotton Bowl)

Team players in the NFL
The following were selected in the 1992 NFL Draft.

Awards and honors
Terrell Buckley, Jim Thorpe Award
Casey Weldon, Johnny Unitas Golden Arm Award

References

Florida State
Florida State Seminoles football seasons
Cotton Bowl Classic champion seasons
Florida State Seminoles football